Andreja Klepač (born 13 March 1986) is an inactive professional Slovenian tennis player. On 14 July 2008, Klepač reached her career-high singles rankings of world No. 99. On 11 April 2022, she peaked at No. 11 in the WTA doubles rankings.

Career
She has made one WTA Tour singles final in Budapest in 2008 and won ten WTA Tour doubles titles and appeared in twelve other finals.

In July 2013, she won her first WTA doubles title in Bad Gastein with Sandra Klemenschits. 

In 2015, Klepač reached quarterfinals at the Australian Open with Klaudia Jans-Ignacik and US Open with Lara Arruabarrena.

In 2017, together with María José Martínez Sánchez, she reached at the US Open her third consecutive quarterfinal at this major. In 2018, they also reached three finals, defeating en route top pairs Latisha Chan/Andrea Sestini Hlaváčková (Brisbane) and Timea Babos/Kristina Mladenovic (Doha). They lost two tie-breakers in the semifinal of the Madrid Open against Ekaterina Makarova/Elena Vesnina.

Klepač also reached the quarterfinals of the 2018 French Open, the 2019 Australian Open, partnering with Martínez Sánchez, and the 2021 French Open, alongside Croatian Darija Jurak.

World TeamTennis
Klepac has played four seasons with World TeamTennis starting in 2016 when she debuted in the league with the Washington Kastles. In 2017, she played her first season for the Orange County Breakers and was named the Female MVP of the 2017 World TeamTennis Finals after leading the Breakers to the title. She played for Breakers for the 2018 and 2019 seasons as well. 

It was announced that she will be joining the Orange County Breakers during the 2020 WTT season set to begin July 12.

Significant finals

WTA 1000 finals

Doubles: 3 (1 title, 2 runner-ups)

WTA Elite Trophy

Singles: 1 (title)

Grand Slam doubles performance timeline

WTA career finals

Singles: 1 (runner-up)

Doubles: 23 (11 titles, 12 runner-ups)

ITF Career finals

Singles: 7 (3 titles, 4 runner–ups)

Doubles: 22 (14 titles, 8 runner–ups)

References

External links

 
 
 

1986 births
Living people
Slovenian female tennis players
Sportspeople from Koper
Tennis players at the 2012 Summer Olympics
Olympic tennis players of Slovenia